The 2002 Polish Film Awards ran on March 9, 2002, at Royal Palace, Warsaw. It was the 4th edition of Polish Film Awards: Eagles.

Awards winners

Special awards

 Life Achievement Award: Tadeusz Konwicki
 Special Award: Agnieszka Holland, Sławomir Idziak
 Audience Award: Cześć Tereska

External links
 2002 Polish Film Awards at IMDb

Polish Film Awards ceremonies
Polish Film Awards
Polish Film Awards, 2002